Acrocyum is a genus of flea beetles in the family Chrysomelidae. There are six described species in Acrocyum, which are distributed in North and Central America, including the West Indies.  The genus is included in the Blepharida-group of genera.

Species
The genus includes the following species:
 Acrocyum dorsale Jacoby, 1885 – Mexico
 Acrocyum haitiense (Blake, 1938) – Hispaniola
 Acrocyum interpositum (Bechyné & Bechyné, 1963) – El Salvador
 Acrocyum maculicolle Jacoby, 1885 – Mexico
 Acrocyum sallaei Jacoby, 1885 – Mexico, southern Arizona?
 Acrocyum tarsatum Jacoby, 1885 – Guatemala

References

Alticini
Chrysomelidae genera
Taxa named by Martin Jacoby
Articles created by Qbugbot
Beetles of North America